is a passenger railway station on the Uchiko branch of the Yosan Line located in the town of Uchiko, Kita District, Ehime Prefecture, Japan. It is operated by JR Shikoku and has the station number "U10".

Lines
Although Uchiko Station is officially on the Uchiko Line, JR Shikoku runs it operationally as part of Yosan Line and as such it only carries the "U" prefix common to other Yosan line stations. Connections with other services are needed to travel further east of Matsuyama on the line.

In addition, the Uwakai limited express also stops at the station.

Layout
The station consists of an island platform and a side platform serving three elevated tracks. A station building of tradition Japanese design with a tiled roof is located underneath the elevated structure and houses a waiting room and a JR ticket window (with a Midori no Madoguchi facility) on level 1. Stairs lead to a landing at level 2 which also has seats for waiting passengers. From there separate flights of stairs lead to level 3 where platforms 1 and 2 (island) and platform 3 (side platform) are located. An elevator is provided after the ticket gate on level 1 which leads directly to platforms 1 and 2 only. A bike shed is provided and parking is available under the elevated structure.

Adjacent stations

History
On October 6, 1935, after the track had been re-gauged to 1,067 mm, the station became part of the Uchiko Line. The track at Uchiko was re-aligned and elevated and the station location moved. The new station reopened on 3 March 1986. It was still designated as a station on the Uchiko Line but was now operated as part of the Yosan Line. With the privatization of JNR on 1 April 1987, control of the station passed to JR Shikoku.

Surrounding area
Uchiko Town Hall Main Building
Ikazaki Kite Museum

See also
 List of railway stations in Japan

References

External links
Uchiko Station (JR Shikoku)

Railway stations in Ehime Prefecture
Railway stations in Japan opened in 1920
Uchiko, Ehime